Saken Adilkhanuly Zhasuzakov (Säken Ädılhanūly Jasūzaqov, ; born 27 October 1957) was a Kazakh politician and Colonel General in the Kazakh Ground Forces. He was Minister of Defense of Kazakhstan from September 2016 until August 2018.

Biography 

He was born in Chaldar, a village in Southern Kazakhstan in 1957. In 1978, Zhasuzakov graduated from the Alma-Ata Higher All-Arms Command School. From September 1987 to June 1990 he was a pupil of the M. V. Frunze Military Academy. In July 1994 he moved to Russia to attend the Military Academy of the General Staff of the Russian Armed Forces. In 1996, he was appointed Deputy Chief of Staff of the Armed Forces of Kazakhstan.

In 2003, he became First Deputy Commander of Land Forces, and that same year he became Commander of the Regional Command "East". In April 2009, Zhasuzakov was appointed the Commander-in-Chief of the Ground Forces. From 2013 to 2016, Zhasuzakov was the First Deputy Minister of Defence of Kazakhstan. He was appointed as Minister of Defense of Kazakhstan by Presidential Decree on 13 September 2016.

He was replaced as defense minister on 7 August 2018 by Nurlan Ermekbaev. He currently heads the National Defence University in Astana. Exactly a year later, he retired from the military.

Education 
1978 — Alma-Ata Higher All-Arms Command School
1990 — M. V. Frunze Military Academy
1996 — Military Academy of the General Staff of the Armed Forces of Russia

Awards 
 USSR:
 Order "For Service to the Homeland in the Armed Forces of the USSR" 3rd degree (1989)
 Jubilee Medal "70 Years of the Armed Forces of the USSR"
 Medal "For Impeccable Service" 2nd and 3rd Degree
 Breastplate "Soldiers-Internationalists"
 Kazakhstan:
 Order of Dunk 1st Degree (2012)
 Order of Dunk 2nd Degree (2001)
 Medal "10 years of Independence of the Republic of Kazakhstan"
 Medal "10 Years of the Armed Forces of the Republic of Kazakhstan"
 Medal "10 Years of the Constitution of Kazakhstan"
 Medal "10 years of Astana"
 Medal "20 Years of Independence of the Republic of Kazakhstan"
 Medal "20 Years of the Armed Forces of the Republic of Kazakhstan"
 Medal "For Impeccable Service" 2nd and 3rd Degree
 Medal "For Strengthening Military Cooperation"
 Medal "20 Years of Public Prosecutor of the Republic of Kazakhstan"
 Jubilee Medal "20 years of Internal Troops of Kazakhstan"
 Russia:
 Medal of Zhukov
 Belarus:
 Medal "60th Anniversary of the liberation of Belarus from Nazi invaders"
 Kyrgyzstan:
 Medal "For Distinction in Military Service"
 Ukraine:
 Jubilee Medal "60 years of Ukraine's liberation from Nazi invaders"
 Mongolia:
 Medal "50th Anniversary of the Mongolian People's Republic"
 Medal "Military Cooperation"
 Tajikistan:
 Medal "5 years of the Armed Forces of the Republic of Tajikistan"
 Medal "15 Years of the Armed Forces of the Republic of Tajikistan

See also 
Minister of Defense (Kazakhstan)
Armed Forces of the Republic of Kazakhstan

References 

Soviet military personnel of the Soviet–Afghan War
1957 births
Living people
Ministers of Defence of Kazakhstan
Chiefs of the General Staff (Kazakhstan)
Military Academy of the General Staff of the Armed Forces of Russia alumni
Frunze Military Academy alumni